The Holy Roman Empress or Empress of the Holy Roman Empire (Kaiserin des Heiligen Römischen Reiches) was the wife or widow of the Holy Roman Emperor. The elective dignity of Holy Roman emperor was restricted to males only, but some empresses, such as Theophanu and Maria Theresa, were de facto rulers of the Empire.

Holy Roman Empresses
Before 924, the title of emperor was not always associated with the German kingdom; rather, it was initially associated with the Carolingian dynasty, and then possessed by several other figures of the 9th and 10th centuries. Their wives were thus empresses, but not necessarily German queens.

Carolingian

Holy Roman Empresses/Queens of Germany
With the elevation of Otto I of Germany in 962 to the Imperial title, the title 'Roman King/Emperor' became inalienably associated with the Kingdom of Germany – although a King of Germany might not bear the Imperial title, it would be impossible to become a Holy Roman Emperor, without being King of Germany first. The women in the following sections were all Queens of Germany as well as Roman Empresses.

Ottonian dynasty

Salian dynasty

House of Supplinburg

House of Hohenstaufen

House of Welf

House of Hohenstaufen

House of Wittelsbach

House of Luxembourg

House of Habsburg

House of Wittelsbach

House of Lorraine

House of Habsburg-Lorraine

See also

 List of Roman Empresses (24 BC–AD 1453).
 List of Austrian Empresses (1804–1918).
 List of German queens
 List of Italian queens
 List of Burgundian consorts

References

Empresses
Holy Roman